Myopinae is a subfamily of flies from the family Conopidae.

Tribes
Myopini
Sicini
Zodionini

References

 Bugguide.net. Subfamily Myopinae

Conopidae
Brachycera subfamilies